Moody River is a studio album by Pat Boone, released in 1961 on Dot Records.

Track listing

References 

1961 albums
Pat Boone albums
Dot Records albums